The Port of Immingham, also known as Immingham Dock, is a major port on the east coast of England, located on the south bank of the Humber Estuary in the town of Immingham, Lincolnshire. In 2019, the Port of Grimsby & Immingham was the largest port in the United Kingdom by tonnage with 54.1 million tonnes of cargo passing through that year.

The port was established by the Humber Commercial Railway and Dock Company in association with the Great Central Railway; the dock company incorporated and the works permitted by the Humber Commercial Railway and Dock Act of 1901. Construction of the dock started in 1906 and was completed by 1912. The original main purpose of the dock was export of coal.

In the second half of the 20th century the port was considerably expanded beyond its locked dock, and east and west jetties; with the addition of several deep water jetties for bulk cargos: this included the Immingham Oil Terminal (1969, expanded 1994) for oil importation to the new Continental Oil and Lindsay Oil refineries; the Immingham Bulk Terminal (1970) built as a joint scheme by the National Coal Board and British Steel Corporation for coal export and iron ore import; the Immingham Gas Jetty (1985) for LPG import; and the Humber International Terminal (2000, expanded 2006) for bulk cargos. Roll-on/Roll-off terminals were first operated in 1966, and expanded within the dock in the 1990s, and outside the dock at the Immingham Outer Harbour (2006).

History

Background

From the mid 19th century onwards the Manchester, Sheffield & Lincolnshire Railway developed the Port of Grimsby into a modern outlet for its rail system onto the east coast of England.

In 1874 a report was commissioned from Charles Liddell on alternatives to expansion at Grimsby – it recommended a new dock west of Grimsby at South Killingholme, preferable due to low land costs and proximity to the Humber Estuary's navigable channel. Liddel's scheme was not proceeded with at that time.

In 1900 the Humber Commercial Railway and Dock Company was formed with the aim of expanding the Grimsby Docks system – it sought powers from parliament to build a new dock west adjacent of the Royal Dock, and north of Alexandra Dock, on the banks of the Humber; this development was passed in 1901 as the Humber Commercial Railway and Dock Act. The Great Central Railway (GCR), owner of the Grimsby Docks was willing to back the scheme, but sought the advice of Sir John Wolfe Barry, who reported that the approach channel to the dock would have required extensive dredging; he later reported in favour of a scheme near Immingham, similar in location to that earlier proposed by Liddel. The GCR acquired land near their preferred dock, and informed the promoters of the scheme it was to withdraw its support, unless the scheme was changed to one better positioned on the Humber, near Stallingborough, nearer to a deep water channel;

Plans were submitted to parliament in 1902 for a dock near Immingham, but the bill was withdrawn due to conditions requiring the GCR to dredge the Humber shipping channels to undo any change thought to have been caused by the dock works. Under pressure from interested parties the Board of Trade commissioned an inspection of the channels, which reported that no serious negative change would be expected from the new dock works. A bill was re-submitted in 1903. Features of the scheme were: a new dock in the parish of Immingham with lock and entrance channel, with jetties on the east and west side; a railway with a junction north of the Great Central Railway's line at Ulceby station to the dock; and rights to dredge, divert streams (Immingham Haven), to raise funds, to make working arrangements with the Great Central Railway; and rights of compulsory purchase. The scheme was passed as the Humber Commercial Railway and Dock Act, 1904. The 1904 act was modified by subsequent acts in 1908, 1909, and 1913, which extended the time for construction, allowed raising additional capital, and made minor changes to the original plans. The primary purpose of the dock was export of coal from Derbyshire and Yorkshire coalfields.

Construction and opening, 1906–1912

Work was formally initiated on the dock by Lady Henderson, wife of the Great Central chairman Alexander Henderson in July 1906.

The light railway to Grimsby was connected to the Great Coates branch by 1906; the line was used during the construction of the dock by the contractors, and a passenger service was begun in 1910.

Initial work on the dock included diversion of drains, and dredging of the entrance channel to the Humber. Approximately  of excavated material from the dock was used in the construction for levelling. The dock walls were made of concrete, with granite coping; the lock pit was constructed with concrete side walls and a shallow inverted arch of brickwork at the invert. Installation of the lock gates and their machinery was by Head Wrightson.

The design incorporated space for two further arms on the east side, mirroring the western arms. At the entrance where two jetties extending  into the river, forming a guiding shape for the lock entrance – the eastern jetty was intended to be used for passenger services, whilst the western jetty found initial use as a coal loading point.

The south quay of the dock was entirely equipped for coal export, with seven coal hoists, with capacity of 400 tons per hour. Extensive sidings were built mainly to the south of the dock, with inbound storage available for 8,000 (loaded) coal wagons, and outbound storage for 3,500 wagons. The north-western arm was initially built as a timber pond, with adjacent rail sidings. Coal hoists were hydraulically powered, supplied by gravity sidings carried across sidings by ferro-concrete bridges built by the Yorkshire Hennebique Contracting Company (Leeds). Six of the hoists were supplied by W.G. Armstrong Whitworth and Company; the seventh, a movable hoist was supplied by Tannet, Walker and Company (Leeds). The north quay of the south-western arm was used for pig iron handling, and was equipped with ten movable cranes from Armstrong Whitworth of lifting capacity of 5 or 3 tons, and a fixed crane with lifting capacity of up to 50 tons. Further cranes from Cowans, Sheldon & Company (Carlisle) were supplied for the transit sheds.

Much of the dock equipment was power via hydraulic power, whilst electrical power transmission was used for lighting, railway signalling, pumping equipment for the graving dock, and other purposes, including conveyor motors in the grain silo. For both purposes a power station,  in ground plan was erected on the dock estate west of the main lock entrance. Most of the hydraulic machinery was supplied by W.G. Armstrong Whitworth and Company. The electrical network included a substation halfway between Grimsby and Immingham supplying the Grimsby District Light Railway with 530 V DC; as well as a 1,200 kW 460 V supply via overhead electrical cable to the Grimsby Docks. Most of the electrical equipment was supplied by British Thomson-Houston.

The Humber Commercial Railway carried its first goods in July 1910. The Barton and Immingham Light Railway opened May 1911. A distant related work was the Doncaster Avoiding Line sanctioned 1903, and contracted in 1908 – the line allowed trains from west of Doncaster to avoid congestion at Doncaster station. An electrified tram line, the Grimsby and Immingham Electric Railway, parallel to the Grimsby District Light Railway was begun 1909 and opened 1912. On the dock estate a sixty locomotive capacity engine house was constructed. (See also Immingham engine shed.)

Due to high demand for coal shipment facilities in the aftermath of a coal strike, the dock was provisionally opened on 15 May 1912. The dock was official opened on 22 July 1912 by the King George V and Queen Mary; at the ceremony permission was given to name the new dock "The King's Dock", a moniker which did not persist; Sam Fay, general manager of the GCR was unexpectedly knighted by the King during the proceedings.

Shortly after opening a large reinforced concrete grain silo was completed (1913), capable of holding 20,000 tons of grain. The silo was built by Stuart's Granolithic Company, and grain handling equipment supplied by Henry Simon (Manchester).

History (1914–1969)

During the First World War, Immingham was a submarine base for British D class submarine.

During the 1930s the port was used for cruise ships, with vessels of the Orient Steam Navigation Company, White Star Line and Blue Star Line calling at the port.

During the Second World War the port was used as a naval base, and was the Royal Navy's headquarters for the Humber. Anti-aircraft batteries were located around the dock during the war.

During the war John Dowland and Leonard Harrison received the George Cross for defusing a bomb that had fallen onto the grain ship SS Kildare in February 1940 in Immingham Dock.

In 1950 a fertilizer plant was established on the dock estate, to the southeast. (See Fisons, Immingham.)

In 1957 construction of a new dry dock was begun, after acquisition of the Humber Gracing Dock & Engineering company by Richardsons Westgarth & Company; the new dry dock opened 1960, known as Henderson's Graving Dock.

The port's first roll-on/roll-off facility was constructed in 1966 for Tor Line.

History (1970–present)
The Immingham Oil Terminal (IOT) jetty on the banks of the Humber west of the dock entrance was opened 1969. The terminal was built to serve the new oil refineries (Continental Oil Refinery and Lindsey Oil Refinery) built near west of the Immingham Dock site. The initial construction consisted of a pier into the Humber with two berths, suitable for ships up to 200,000 dwt. The dolphin berths were constructed from  diameter tubes with  wall thickness driven over  into the underlying ground, in groups of 3 to 6 tubes.

Immingham Bulk Terminal was commissioned in 1970 jointly by the National Coal Board (NCB) and British Steel Corporation (BSC) in association with the British Transport Docks Board (BTDB) for the export of coal and import of steel. The cost of the terminal was £11.5 million. The coal terminal was designed to increase the efficiency of coal export by the NCB, the terminal was taken over by the BTDB in 1973, and leased back to the NCB and BSC, it was the NCB's main point of export for coal (1982). The ore terminal was part of British Steel's "Anchor" modernisation project at its Scunthorpe Steelworks, the ore terminal was completed 1972. Vessel capacities for the terminals were 100,000 dwt for the ore terminal and 35,000 dwt for the coal terminal.

A Liquid Petroleum Gas handling jetty "Immingham Gas Jetty" was opened in 1985 at a cost of £5 million; the terminal was connected to underground storage operated by Conoco and Calor Gas.

A third berth was commissioned at the Immingham oil terminal in 1994 at a cost of £18 million.

In June 1995 a new £13.5 million terminal was opened for shipping company DFDS. Located on the south-western arm of the dock, in 1999 the terminal had 4 roll-on/roll-off berths on a  site.

The shipyard at the graving docks closed in 2001. The Henderson Graving Dock has been converted into a shipping berth.

Humber International Terminal (HIT) became operational in August 2000. The main work was contracted to Edmund Nuttall and HAM Dredging. In 2005 Associated British Ports decided to invest a further £15 million on a "Phase 2" extension of the terminal. The terminal was formally opened by the Princess Royal in 2006.

A new Immingham West Jetty for petrochemical handling was contracted to Edmund Nuttall to a design by engineering firm Halcrow.

Three of the five permitted berths were constructed, and the Immingham Outer Harbour opened 2006.

In 2007/8, a £45 million 200,000 ton pa biofuel plant was constructed at the Port of Immingham, manufacturing biodiesel  from vegetable oils.

In 2008 a  site was acquired in Stallingborough in 2008 to increase off dock estate storage space for cars. The site was operational by 2011.

In 2013 ABP began the development of the "Immingham Renewable Fuels Terminal" on the Humber International Terminal site, as part of a 15-year contract with Drax Power Station to supply biomass (wood pellet) to the powerplant. ABP's total investment in biomass handling facilities, including installations at Hull and Goole was to be around £100 million. The project entered the commissioning phase in mid 2014. The second phase of the project was to add a further 3 million tons pa capacity. Two 2,300 ton per hour screw unloading biomass handling cranes were installed by May 2015.

In 2018 Associated British Ports took over operation of British Steel's Immingham Bulk Terminal with an investment of £65 million. At the same time Derbyshire based metal and recycling specialist, Ward, opened a deep sea dock export facility at Immingham to expand its capabilities to export metal. British Steel took back control of the Immingham port facility in 2020.

Seafarers Welfare

The port has a seafarers centre where chaplains from the Catholic seafarers charity Apostleship of the Sea are based.

See also

Immingham Dock railway station, Immingham Dock electric railway station, Immingham (Eastern Jetty) railway station – railway stations on the dock estate
Industry of the South Humber Bank
Port of Hull, specifically King George Dock, a contemporary (1914) development on the north bank of the Humber.

Notes

Acts and legislation

, Act for a new dock in Grimsby.
, a proposed dock to be sited instead at a site in Immingham. 
, modifications of the 1904 act.
, clarification, additional capital. 
,

References

Maps and landmark coordinates

Sources

Further reading

External links

Homepage of Immingham Museum & Heritage Centre which portrays the history of the docks and railway

Ports and harbours of Lincolnshire
Ports and harbours of the Humber
History of Lincolnshire
Economy of Lincolnshire
Immingham